Christopher James Wood (born 26 November 1987) is an English professional golfer who currently plays on the European Tour. He was the low amateur in the 2008 Open Championship at Royal Birkdale and tied for third in the following year's tournament held at Turnberry.

Amateur career
Wood was born in Bristol, England. He went to school at Golden Valley Primary School in Nailsea between the ages of 4 and 11, before leaving to join Backwell School. He began playing golf at a young age. He was a keen footballer with aspirations to play for Bristol City Football Club but following a serious knee injury he devoted himself to golf. He became a member at the Long Ashton Golf Club near Bristol at the age of 9 and obtained a single-figure handicap by age 12. Wood was the English Amateur Order of Merit winner in 2007 and 2008.

In May 2008, Wood won the Welsh Open Amateur Stroke Play Championship at Conwy. He finished with a score of 289 (74–75–69–71) to take the title by six strokes over teammate Sam Hutsby and by eight over Jamie Abbott from Suffolk. After his victory Wood said "I putted much better today. I stayed pretty patient all the way around. My swing felt good and playing with Gary Wolstenholme kept me relaxed. This is the biggest event I've won so I may take a few days off now."

On 17 July 2008, Wood teed off at Royal Birkdale for the 2008 Open Championship with his father as his caddie. He raised speculation in the press that he could have become the first amateur to win the tournament since Bobby Jones, who won it in 1926, 1927 and 1930. He spoke about his qualification into the weekend of The Open and play at the tournament; "I love playing in front of a crowd," he said after a three over par third round 73. "I've been getting standing ovations on every green. It's been awesome. But I must admit it is now getting daunting for me and I got nervous when they announced my name on the first tee in the third round." He finished joint fifth overall alongside Jim Furyk and was awarded the silver medal as the top amateur.

Professional career
After his success at the Open championship, Wood decided to turn professional. In November he gained his European Tour card for 2009 by finishing in a tie for 5th at qualifying school held at PGA Golf de Catalunya near Girona, Spain; "I've worked really hard for this so I feel like I deserve everything I've achieved, but this does cap a pretty amazing year for me," he said.

Through July of his rookie season, Wood has made 13 of 17 cuts while recording four top-10 finishes. A superb final round at Turnberry in the 2009 Open Championship put Wood in contention for his first major win. A birdie at the final hole would have sufficed but Wood's approach took a hard bounce and ran through the green. A par would have seen him contest the playoff but his par putt finished on the edge of the hole so he had to settle for a joint 3rd-place finish with Lee Westwood. "I've never hit a nine iron 210 yards in my life," he told BBC Sport. "There's nothing I could have done about it. It went miles."

Thanks to his performance at the Open, Wood qualified for the Dubai World Championship and was named the European Tour's rookie of the year. Finishing in the top four at the Open also gave Wood a spot in the 2010 Masters Tournament. He missed the cut by seven strokes.

Wood made a good start to 2011 by tying for the Africa Open but lost to Open champion Louis Oosthuizen on the first playoff hole.

Wood claimed his maiden championship in August 2012 when he took the Thailand Open on the OneAsia Tour. He followed this by winning the Commercial Bank Qatar Masters in January 2013, his first European Tour victory, making an eagle on the last hole to win by one stroke. "It's a dream come true," he said after his three-under-par 69 took him to 18 under. "There's an enormous weight lifted off my shoulders. I feel like I can go on and win more. I knew it was going to be hard no matter how I played – winning on the European Tour is not easy."

In June 2015, Wood won his second European tour title at the Lyoness Open with a two-stroke victory over Rafa Cabrera-Bello. He started the day five shots behind leader Grégory Bourdy, but shot a bogey-free final round of 67 to take the victory.

The 2016 season started with a third place at the Nedbank Golf Challenge in Sun City, South Africa. In May, Wood won the 2016 BMW PGA Championship at Wentworth Club; the win lifted him at the 22nd place of the Official World Golf Ranking and guaranteed him an automatic selection for the 2016 Ryder Cup.

Wood paired up with Justin Rose in his career debut at the Ryder Cup for a 1 up victory against Jimmy Walker and Zach Johnson in Saturday's foursomes; in the singles, he lost (1 up) to Dustin Johnson.

Amateur wins
2007 Russian Amateur Championship
2008 Welsh Amateur Open Stroke Play Championship

Professional wins (4)

European Tour wins (3)

European Tour playoff record (0–1)

OneAsia Tour wins (1)

Results in major championships

LA = Low amateur
CUT = missed the half-way cut
WD = withdrew
"T" = tied

Summary

Most consecutive cuts made – 3 (twice)
Longest streak of top-10s – 2 (2008 Open Championship – 2009 Open Championship)

Results in World Golf Championships
Results not in chronological order before 2015.

QF, R16, R32, R64 = Round in which player lost in match play
WD = withdrew
"T" = tied

Team appearances
Amateur
European Amateur Team Championship (representing England): 2008
Bonallack Trophy (representing Europe): 2008 (winners)

Professional
Seve Trophy (representing Great Britain & Ireland): 2009 (winners), 2013
World Cup (representing England): 2013, 2016
EurAsia Cup (representing Europe): 2016 (winners)
Ryder Cup (representing Europe) : 2016

Ryder Cup points record

See also
2008 European Tour Qualifying School graduates

References

External links

English male golfers
European Tour golfers
Ryder Cup competitors for Europe
Sportspeople from Bristol
1987 births
Living people